Hayes Township may refer to the following places in the U.S. state of Michigan:

 Hayes Township, Charlevoix County, Michigan
 Hayes Township, Clare County, Michigan
 Hayes Township, Otsego County, Michigan

See also 
 Hay Township, Michigan
 Haynes Township, Michigan

Michigan township disambiguation pages